The 1984 NCAA Division I-AA football season, part of college football in the United States organized by the National Collegiate Athletic Association at the Division I-AA level, began in August 1984, and concluded with the 1984 NCAA Division I-AA Football Championship Game on December 15, 1984, at Johnson Hagood Stadium in Charleston, South Carolina. The Montana State Bobcats won their first I-AA championship, defeating the Louisiana Tech Bulldogs by a score of 19−6.

Conference changes and new programs
Prior to the season, the Gulf Star Conference was formed by six I-AA Independent and Division II teams from Louisiana and Texas. The league would continue for three seasons before being absorbed by the Southland Conference in 1987.

Conference standings

Conference champions

Postseason
The top four teams were seeded, and received first-round byes. Undefeated Tennessee State was disqualified from the postseason due to the use of ineligible players.

NCAA Division I-AA playoff bracket

*indicates overtime period

References